Geoffrey Neil Pollard, AM (born 18 January 1944) is an Australian sports administrator and former professional tennis player. He was awarded a Member of the Order of Australia in the 1989 Australia Day Honours list.

A left-handed player from Sydney, Pollard was active as a player in the 1960s and 1970s. He lost to John Newcombe in the junior singles final of the 1961 Australian Championships and earned selection on Australia's Junior Davis Cup team. In 1962 he was runner-up to Tony Roche in the 18s and under Orange Bowl tournament.

Pollard, a University of Sydney science graduate, partnered with Kaye Dening to win a mixed doubles gold medal at the 1967 Summer Universiade in Tokyo. He won through to the singles third round of the 1968 Australian Championships, where he was eliminated by the fifth-seed Barry Phillips-Moore.

During the 1980s, Pollard served as President of the New South Wales Lawn Tennis Association and was on the Board of Directors for the Australian Institute of Sport. He was also a senior lecturer in statistics at Macquarie University.

From 1989 to 2010 he was President of Tennis Australia.

References

External links
 
 

1944 births
Living people
Australian male tennis players
Australian sports executives and administrators
Tennis executives
University of Sydney alumni
Academic staff of Macquarie University
Tennis players from Sydney
Members of the Order of Australia
Universiade medalists in tennis
Universiade gold medalists for Australia
Universiade silver medalists for Australia
Medalists at the 1967 Summer Universiade
Medalists at the 1970 Summer Universiade